Romanogobio johntreadwelli is a species of cyprinid fish endemic to China.

Named in honor of John Treadwell Nichols (1883-1958), curator of fishes at the American Museum of Natural History, who first studied specimens on which this new species is based.

References

Romanogobio
Fish described in 1973
Taxa named by Petre Mihai Bănărescu
Taxa named by Teodor T. Nalbant